Ally Miller (born 10 May 1996) is a Scottish rugby union player who plays for Glasgow Warriors in the United Rugby Championship having previously played for Edinburgh Rugby in the Pro14 and London Scottish in the RFU Championship. Miller plays along the back row.

Rugby Union career

Amateur career

Miller started his rugby career playing at minis with Preston Lodge and Musselburgh.

Miller then played for Melrose in the Scottish Premiership.

Professional career

Miller signed for London Scottish in the 2016-2017 season. He won the Sir Tommy Macpherson Quaich from the Friends of Scottish Rugby for that season.

The following season Miller signed for Edinburgh. Miller made his debut for Edinburgh on 2 November 2018.

Miller signed for Glasgow Warriors in 2021. He said of the move:
I’ve heard really good things from the boys about the crowd here. Seeing all the games on TV with the Warrior Nation in full voice makes you want to make a good impression and hopefully it’s not too long before we get the chance to play in front of them. It’s a great pitch here - it really suits fast rugby and that in turn suits the way I enjoy playing.I love having the ball in my hands and attacking. I’m keen to work on my defence though with the coaches here and really bring those aspects further into my game. Hopefully I’ll get plenty of opportunity to run with the ball this season, and really enjoy the Glasgow style of play.

Miller made his competitive debut for the provincial Glasgow side on 2 October 2021, against the South African side Sharks, replacing Ryan Wilson at flanker on 70 minutes. Miller earned the Glasgow Warrior No. 335.

International career

Miller made his Scotland 7s debut in the 2017 World Series in the legs at Las Vegas and Vancouver.

References

1996 births
Living people
Rugby union players from Edinburgh
Edinburgh Rugby players
Glasgow Warriors players
Scotland international rugby sevens players
Musselburgh RFC players
London Scottish F.C. players
Preston Lodge RFC players
Melrose RFC players
Scottish rugby union players
Rugby union flankers